In principio (Latin "In the beginning") may refer to:

Genesis 1:1: In principio creavit Deus cælum et terram.
John 1:1: In principio erat verbum.

Music
In principio, for choir and orchestra by Arvo Pärt
In principio, chant by Hildegard von Bingen
In principio, work for piano by Ludovico Einaudi
In principio erat verbum, motet by Josquin Desprez
In principio erat verbum, motet by Orlando di Lasso
In Principio, track by Dutch trance project Gaia